The Journal of Human Genetics is a monthly peer-reviewed scientific journal covering all aspects of human genetics and genomics. It was established in 1956 as the Japanese Journal of Human Genetics and was independently published by the Japan Society of Human Genetics. It obtained its current name in 1992. According to the Journal Citation Reports, Journal of Human Genetics has a 2020 impact factor of 3.172.

History 
In 1998, Springer Science+Business Media took over publishing the journal. While under Springer, the publication frequency changed from bimonthly to monthly. 

It has been published by the Nature Publishing Group since January 2009. 

Since 2014, the editor-in-chief has been Naomichi Matsumoto (Yokohama City University).

References

External links 
 

Medical genetics journals
Nature Research academic journals
Springer Science+Business Media academic journals
Publications established in 1956
Monthly journals
English-language journals
Academic journals associated with learned and professional societies